Vestfold is one of the 19 multi-member constituencies of the Storting, the national legislature of Norway. The constituency was established in 1921 following the introduction of proportional representation for elections to the Storting. It consists of the municipalities of Færder, Holmestrand, Horten, Larvik, Sandefjord and Tønsberg in the county of Vestfold og Telemark. The constituency currently elects six of the 169 members of the Storting using the open party-list proportional representation electoral system. At the 2021 parliamentary election it had 182,961 registered electors.

Electoral system
Vestfold currently elects six of the 169 members of the Storting using the open party-list proportional representation electoral system. Constituency seats are allocated by the County Electoral Committee using the Modified Sainte-Laguë method. Compensatory seats (seats at large) are calculated based on the national vote and are allocated by the National Electoral Committee using the Modified Sainte-Laguë method at the constituency level (one for each constituency). Only parties that reach the 4% national threshold compete for compensatory seats.

Election results

Summary

(Excludes compensatory seats. Figures in italics represent joint lists.)

Detailed

2020s

2021
Results of the 2021 parliamentary election held on 13 September 2021:

The following candidates were elected:
Maria-Karine Aasen-Svensrud (Ap); Kathrine Kleveland (Sp); Erlend Larsen (H); Morten Stordalen (FrP); Truls Vasvik (Ap); Lene Westgaard-Halle (H); and Grete Wold (SV).

2010s

2017
Results of the 2017 parliamentary election held on 11 September 2017:

The following candidates were elected:
Maria-Karine Aasen-Svensrud (Ap); Dag Terje Andersen (Ap); Carl-Erik Grimstad (V); Erlend Larsen (H); Kårstein Eidem Løvaas (H); Morten Stordalen (FrP); and Lene Westgaard-Halle (H).

2013
Results of the 2013 parliamentary election held on 8 and 9 September 2013:

The following candidates were elected:
Dag Terje Andersen (Ap); Anders Anundsen (FrP); Svein Flåtten (H); Kårstein Eidem Løvaas (H); Sonja Mandt (Ap); Morten Stordalen (FrP); and Anders Tyvand (KrF).

2000s

2009
Results of the 2009 parliamentary election held on 13 and 14 September 2009:

The following candidates were elected:
Dag Terje Andersen (Ap); Anders Anundsen (FrP); Svein Flåtten (H); Steinar Gullvåg (Ap); Sonja Mandt (Ap); Per Arne Olsen (FrP); and Inga Marte Thorkildsen (SV).

2005
Results of the 2005 parliamentary election held on 11 and 12 September 2005:

The following candidates were elected:
Dag Terje Andersen (Ap); Anders Anundsen (FrP); Svein Flåtten (H); Steinar Gullvåg (Ap); Sonja Mandt (Ap); Inga Marte Thorkildsen (SV); and Per Ove Width (FrP).

2001
Results of the 2001 parliamentary election held on 9 and 10 September 2001:

The following candidates were elected:
Svein Flåtten (H); Hans Kristian Hogsnes (H); Jørgen Kosmo (Ap); Per Erik Monsen (FrP); Anne Helen Rui (Ap); Elsa Skarbøvik (KrF); Inga Marte Thorkildsen (SV); and Per Ove Width (FrP).

1990s

1997
Results of the 1997 parliamentary election held on 15 September 1997:

The following candidates were elected:
Dag Terje Andersen (Ap); Ole Johs. Brunæs (H); Jørgen Kosmo (Ap); Per Erik Monsen (FrP); Anne Helen Rui (Ap); Elsa Skarbøvik (KrF); and Per Ove Width (FrP).

1993
Results of the 1993 parliamentary election held on 12 and 13 September 1993:

The following candidates were elected:
Ole Johs. Brunæs (H); Oscar Hillgaar (FrP); Jørgen Kosmo (Ap); Eva Lian (Sp); Karin Lian (Ap); Arild Lund (H); and Anne Helen Rui (Ap).

1980s

1989
Results of the 1989 parliamentary election held on 10 and 11 September 1989:

The following candidates were elected:
Ole Johs. Brunæs (H); Inger Dag Steen (SV); Oscar Hillgaar (FrP); Jørgen Kosmo (Ap); Karin Lian (Ap); Ingrid I. Willoch (H); and Ernst Wroldsen (Ap).

1985
Results of the 1985 parliamentary election held on 8 and 9 September 1985:

As the list alliance was entitled to more seats contesting as an alliance than it was contesting as individual parties, the distribution of seats was as list alliance votes. The KrF-Sp list alliance's additional seat was allocated to the Christian Democratic Party.

The following candidates were elected:
Thor Knudsen (H); Jørgen Kosmo (Ap); Karin Lian (Ap); Åge Ramberg (KrF); Morten Steenstrup (H); Ingrid I. Willoch (H); and Ernst Wroldsen (Ap).

1981
Results of the 1981 parliamentary election held on 13 and 14 September 1981:

The following candidates were elected:
Alf Martin Bjørnø (Ap); Thor Knudsen (H); Astrid Murberg Martinsen (Ap); Karen Sogn (H); Morten Steenstrup (H); Ingrid I. Willoch (H); and Ernst Wroldsen (Ap).

1970s

1977
Results of the 1977 parliamentary election held on 11 and 12 September 1977:

The following candidates were elected:
Alf Martin Bjørnø (Ap); Petter Furberg (Ap); Thor Knudsen (H); Astrid Murberg Martinsen (Ap); Åge Ramberg (KrF); Karen Sogn (H); and Odd Vattekar (H).

1973
Results of the 1973 parliamentary election held on 9 and 10 September 1973:

The following candidates were elected:
Torgeir Andersen (H); Alf Martin Bjørnø (Ap); Aslaug Fadum (Sp-V); Petter Furberg (Ap); Astrid Murberg Martinsen (Ap); Åge Ramberg (KrF); and Odd Vattekar (H).

1960s

1969
Results of the 1969 parliamentary election held on 7 and 8 September 1969:

The following candidates were elected:
Torgeir Andersen (H); Theodor Dyring (Sp-KrF); Petter Furberg (Ap); Willy Jansson (Ap); Asbjørn Lillås (Ap); Astrid Murberg Martinsen (Ap); and Odd Vattekar (H).

1965
Results of the 1965 parliamentary election held on 12 and 13 September 1965:

The following candidates were elected:
Johan Andersen (Ap); Theodor Dyring (Sp); Gunvor Katharina Eker (Ap); Borghild Bondevik Haga (V); Asbjørn Lillås (Ap); Rolf Schjerven (H); and Johan Møller Warmedal (H).

1961
Results of the 1961 parliamentary election held on 11 September 1961:

The following candidates were elected:
Johan Andersen (Ap), 44,108 votes; Gunvor Katharina Eker (Ap), 44,104 votes; Asbjørn Lillås (Ap), 44,108 votes; Rolf Schjerven (H), 28,881 votes; Bjarne Støtvig (H), 28,885 votes; Reidar Strømdahl (Ap), 44,108 votes; and Johan Møller Warmedal (H), 28,879 votes.

1950s

1957
Results of the 1957 parliamentary election held on 7 October 1957:

The following candidates were elected:
Johan Andersen (Ap); Torgeir Andreas Berge (Ap); Claudia Olsen (H-Bp); Bjarne Støtvig ((H-Bp); Reidar Strømdahl (Ap); Oscar Torp (Ap); and Johan Møller Warmedal (H-Bp).

1953
Results of the 1953 parliamentary election held on 12 October 1953:

The following candidates were elected:
Johan Andersen (Ap); Torgeir Andreas Berge (Ap); Sigurd Lersbryggen (H); Claudia Olsen (H); Reidar Strømdahl (Ap); Oscar Torp (Ap); and Johan Møller Warmedal (H).

1940s

1949
Results of the 1949 parliamentary election held on 10 October 1949:

The following candidates were elected:
Torgeir Andreas Berge (Ap); Karl Johan Edvardsen (V-Bp); Sigurd Lersbryggen (H); and Reidar Strømdahl (Ap).

1945
Results of the 1945 parliamentary election held on 8 October 1945:

As the list alliance was entitled to more seats contesting as an alliance than it was contesting as individual parties, the distribution of seats was as list alliance votes. The H-Bp list alliance's additional seat was allocated to the Conservative Party.

The following candidates were elected:
Frithjof Bettum (H); Eivind Kristoffer Eriksen (Ap); Laurits Grønland (Ap); and Sigurd Lersbryggen (H).

1930s

1936
Results of the 1936 parliamentary election held on 19 October 1936:

As the list alliance was not entitled to more seats contesting as an alliance than it was contesting as individual parties, the distribution of seats was as party votes.

The following candidates were elected:
Laurits Grønland (Ap); Johan Mathiassen (Ap); Jens Paulus Irgens Odberg (H); and Nils Jacob Schjerven (H).

1933
Results of the 1933 parliamentary election held on 16 October 1933:

As the list alliance was not entitled to more seats contesting as an alliance than it was contesting as individual parties, the distribution of seats was as party votes.

The following candidates were elected:
Svend Foyn Bruun Sr. (BS); Johan Mathiassen (Ap); Nils Jacob Schjerven (BS); and Nils Magnus Nilsen Tvedten (V).

1930
Results of the 1930 parliamentary election held on 20 October 1930:

The following candidates were elected:
Svend Foyn Bruun Sr. (BS); Johan Mathiassen (Ap); Nils Jacob Schjerven (BS); and Nils Magnus Nilsen Tvedten (V).

1920s

1927
Results of the 1927 parliamentary election held on 17 October 1927:

The following candidates were elected:
Svend Foyn Bruun Sr. (H-FV); Hans Kristian Sørensen Kaldager (H-FV); Johan Mathiassen (Ap); and Richard Nilsen Tvedten (Bp).

1924
Results of the 1924 parliamentary election held on 21 October 1924:

The following candidates were elected:
Svend Foyn Bruun Sr. (H-FV); Hans Kristian Sørensen Kaldager (H-FV); Nils Jacob Schjerven (H-FV); and Richard Nilsen Tvedten (Bp).

1921
Results of the 1921 parliamentary election held on 24 October 1921:

The following candidates were elected:
Martin Olsen Nalum (V); Ole Olsen Nauen (H-FV); Nils Jacob Schjerven (H-FV); and Haldor Virik (H-FV).

On 24 January 1922 the Storting voted to re-run of the election in Borre, Brunlanes, Fredriksvern, Hedrum, Lardal, Nøtterøy, Sande, Sandeherad, Sem, Skoger, Stokke, Svelvik, Tjølling, Tjøme and Vaale. Results of the election held on 13 March 1922:

The following candidates were elected:
Martin Olsen Nalum (V); Ole Olsen Nauen (H-FV); Nils Jacob Schjerven (H-FV); and Haldor Virik (H-FV).

Notes

References

Storting constituencies
Storting constituencies established in 1921
Storting constituency